The stylomastoid artery enters the stylomastoid foramen and supplies the tympanic cavity, the tympanic antrum and mastoid cells, and the semicircular canals. It is a branch of the posterior auricular artery, and thus part of the external carotid arterial system.

In the young subject a branch from this vessel forms, with the anterior tympanic artery from the internal maxillary, a vascular circle, which surrounds the tympanic membrane, and from which delicate vessels ramify on that membrane.

It anastomoses with the superficial petrosal branch of the middle meningeal artery by a twig which enters the hiatus canalis facialis.

References

External links
 ArcLab

Arteries of the head and neck